Buratto is an Italian needle lace made by darning on a net.  It is quite similar in appearance to filet lace but with one important distinction—it is darned onto a woven net, rather than the knotted net used for filet.  Buratto tends to also be heavier in appearance due to the woven nature of the netting used

References

Needle lace
Textile arts of Italy